Bookmarks  is a 2020 educational streaming television program presented by Marley Dias. Produced by Jesse Collins Entertainment for Netflix and directed by Fracaswell Hyman, the series premiered on September 1, 2020.

Cast 
 Tiffany Haddish
 Grace Byers
 Caleb McLaughlin
 Lupita Nyong'o
 Marsai Martin
 Karamo Brown
 Jill Scott
 Misty Copeland
 Common
 Jacqueline Woodson
 Kendrick Sampson
 Marley Dias

Episodes

Release 
Bookmarks was released on September 1, 2020, on Netflix.

References

External links 
 
 

2020s American children's television series
2020 American television series debuts
English-language Netflix original programming
Netflix children's programming
American preschool education television series
2020s preschool education television series